Kentucky Route 915 (KY 915) is a road that runs from the city limits of Wilder, Kentucky, to just outside Alexandria, Kentucky, where it joins U.S. 27. The road is a windy, curvy road which has many houses along its path.

Route description
From Wilder, it follows the Licking River for a short while before the river turns north to meet the Ohio River. After that it turns south to head towards Alexandria. The road continues to twist and turn past the city of Cold Spring and through Alexandria. KY 10's west end is at a junction with 915. At this junction, 915 turns right at a 90 degree angle and continues, only to turn back to its original direction soon after. After a four-way junction with KY 536, it continues, roughly paralleling U.S. 27. The road ends at Campbell County High School, where it turns left and meets U.S. 27. Continuing straight, a road commonly referred to as KY 915 continues a short while before also meeting U.S. 27.

History
KY 915 was the original route of KY 9, but the AA Highway was cosigned with KY 9 to prevent a numbering quagmire.

Major intersections

References

0915
0915